Anti-Héroes is the second studio album released by Spanish boyband Auryn. It debuted at No.1 on the PROMUSICAE official Spanish Albums Chart.

Track listing

Charts

Weekly Charts

Annual Charts

Certifications

See also
List of number-one albums of 2013 (Spain)

References

2013 albums
Auryn albums